Fallen Angel is a 1945 American film noir directed by Otto Preminger, with cinematography by Joseph LaShelle, who had also worked with Preminger on Laura a year before. The film features Alice Faye, Dana Andrews, Linda Darnell and Charles Bickford. Fallen Angel was Faye's last film as a major Hollywood star, and she did not appear in another film until State Fair (1962).

Plot
Eric Stanton, a well-dressed but down-on-his-luck drifter, feigns sleep but gets pulled off a bus in the hamlet of Walton because he does not have the fare to continue to San Francisco. He finds a low-budget diner called "Pop's Eats", where Pop is worried about waitress Stella because she has not shown up for work for days. Ex-New York cop Mark Judd tells him not to worry, and the sultry Stella soon returns. Stanton is attracted to her, but she is unimpressed by his smooth talk.

Stanton cons his way into a job with Professor Madley, a traveling fortune teller and spiritualist. He goes to the large house of Clara Mills, daughter of the late mayor, Abraham Mills.

The townspeople are unwilling to buy tickets to Madley's "spook meeting" because Clara Mills, an influential local spinster, disapproves. Stanton gets to Clara through her inexperienced younger sister June and persuades them to attend the performance.

Madley stages an entertaining séance, channeling Abraham Mills, the deceased father of Clara and June. Using information secretly dug up by his assistant Joe Ellis, Madley brings up the sisters' financial problems. The two become upset and leave.

Stanton gets to know Stella, watching her steal from the cash register and go out with men, and falls in love with her. She makes it clear that she wants a man who is willing to marry her and buy her a home, which he agrees to do. To raise the money, Stanton romances and marries June, planning to divorce her as soon as he can. Clara, who has been victimized by a man of Stanton's type in her past, is unable to prevent their marriage.

Stanton cannot stay away from Stella, even on his wedding night. Instead of sleeping with his wife, he goes to Stella, who has given up on him. He explains his odd scheme to her. She rejects him and he leaves watched by Clara who has followed him. He gets home late and is found by June sleeping on the couch.

The next day Stella is found to be murdered. Judd is asked by the local police chief to investigate. He first tries to beat a confession out of Dave Atkins, Stella's latest boyfriend, but Atkins has an airtight alibi. Stanton is also a strong suspect, having been seen quarreling with Stella shortly before her death. Judd tells him not to leave town.

Stanton flees, with June, to a seedy hotel room in San Francisco. He tells her all about his drifter's life of failed schemes. June tells Stanton that she loves him; the next morning, when she goes to the bank to withdraw her money, she is taken into custody for questioning.

Stanton returns to Pop's Eats, where Judd is waiting for him. Stanton has found evidence of Judd’s relationship with Stella and how he left NY police because of his violence.  Stella had decided to marry Atkins rather than wait for Judd's wife to give him a divorce.

Judd pulls out his gun but Pop wrestles it away. Stanton prevents him from shooting Judd, though a shot is fired into the ceiling. This brings a police officer in, and Judd is arrested. Outside, June pulls up in a car and asks Stanton where they are going; he tells her, "Home."

Cast

 Alice Faye as June Mills Stanton
 Dana Andrews as Eric Stanton
 Linda Darnell as Stella
 Charles Bickford as Mark Judd
 Anne Revere as Clara Mills
 Bruce Cabot as Dave Atkins
 John Carradine as Professor Madley
 Percy Kilbride as Pop
 Olin Howland as Joe Ellis

Background
The source of the film was the Marty Holland novel of the same title. Holland also wrote another story that was adapted for the film noir screen, The File on Thelma Jordon (1949). According to the British Film Institute, "Hardly anything is known about Marty Holland except that ‘he’ was a she called Mary, who wrote two or three best-selling pulp novels and then in 1949—to all intents and purposes—vanished, there being no further record of her at all."

Holland faded into obscurity after her last published writing credit in 1952 until the 70th anniversary of crime drama imprint Série noire.  "Contradicting the consensus theory that Holland changed her name from Mary to Marty to hide her gender and come off as 'more masculine,' her photo is on the back cover of first editions of Fallen Angel, and all reviews and news of the time referred to her as 'Miss Holland' or 'Miss Marty Holland.'  Perhaps Marty, that gender-neutral name, sounded more hardboiled than did Mary." Holland lived in Los Angeles  until her death from cancer in 1971.

The film's location shots were in Orange, California.

Reception

Critical response
New York Times film critic Bosley Crowther liked the acting in the film but was disappointed by the story. He wrote, "As the frustrated adventurer, Dana Andrews adds another excellent tight-lipped portrait of a growing gallery. Linda Darnell is beautiful and perfectly cast as the sultry and single-minded siren, while Miss Faye, whose lines often border on the banal, shoulders her first straight, dramatic burden, gracefully. Charles Bickford, as a dishonorably discharged cop, Anne Revere, as Miss Faye's spinster sister, and Percy Kilbride, as the lovesick proprietor of the diner in which Miss Darnell works, are outstanding among the supporting players. But for all of its acting wealth, Fallen Angel falls short of being a top-flight whodunit."

Critic Tim Knight of Reel.com notes that if the viewers can forget the "... headlong dive into preposterousness, it's still a lot of fun". His review adds, "... the movie does have much to recommend, from Joseph La Shelle's atmospheric, black-and-white cinematography to Preminger's taut direction to the juicy, hard-boiled dialogue. Veteran character actors Charles Bickford, John Carradine, and Percy Kilbride (of Ma and Pa Kettle fame) lend strong support to the sizzling twosome of Andrews and Darnell, who made only one more film together, when they were both past their prime: 1957's Zero Hour!, a forgotten grade-Z thriller."

Critic Fernando F. Croce wrote of the film, "Fallen Angel, the director's follow-up to his 1944 classic, is often predictably looked down as a lesser genre venture, yet its subtle analysis of shadowy tropes proves both a continuation and a deepening of Preminger's use of moral ambiguity as a tool of human insight...Preminger's refusal to draw easy conclusions—his pragmatic curiosity for people—is reflected in his remarkable visual fluidity, the surveying camera constantly moving, shifting dueling points-of-view in order to give them equal weight. Fallen Angel may not satisfy genre fans who like their noir with fewer gray zones, but the director's take on obsession remains no less fascinating for trading suspense for multilayered lucidity."

See also
 List of American films of 1945

References

External links
 
 
 
 
 

1945 films
1945 crime drama films
20th Century Fox films
American black-and-white films
American crime drama films
Film noir
Films based on American novels
Films directed by Otto Preminger
Films scored by David Raksin
Films set in California
Films set in San Francisco
Films with screenplays by Harry Kleiner
1940s English-language films
1940s American films